Radon Labs was a German video game developer based in Berlin. The company was founded in 2000 as a spin-off of the company Terratools. Radon Labs has its headquarters in Berlin and a second development studio in Halle-Leipzig. The company filed for bankruptcy in May 2010 and was bought by the browsergames publisher Bigpoint GmbH.

Products

3D Engine 
Radon Labs is the creator of the Nebula Device, an Open Source 3D game engine. Radon Labs released its engine under MIT license in 2006 and a later version in 2011.

Selected games 
 Urban Assault (1998)
 Project Nomads (2001)
 Paws and Claws: Pet Vet (2005)
 Riding Star 2 (2006)
 Riding Star 3 DS (2007)
 Treasure Island (2008)
 Drakensang: The Dark Eye (2008)
 Drakensang: The River of Time (2010)
 Future  Wars (2010) 
 Crazy Quiz Wii (2010)
 Schwarzenberg'' (Cancelled)

References

External links 
Radon Labs at MobyGames
The Nebula Device on SourceForge
The Nebula Device 3 on Google Code

Video game development companies
Defunct video game companies of Germany
Companies established in 1995
Companies based in Berlin
German companies established in 1995
1995 establishments in Germany